This article lists the governors of the , a collective name for the groups of Japanese islands within Tokyo Metropolis, consisting of the Izu Islands, the Bonin Islands and the Volcano Islands. The islands are located to the south of the Japanese home islands.

The list encompasses the period from the founding of the first permanent settlement of Westerners on Chichijima (one of the Bonin Islands) in 1830 (under the auspices of the British, which claimed the islands in 1827), until the return of the islands to Japanese sovereignty in 1968 (following the U.S. occupation after World War II).

Officeholders 
Source: 

† denotes people who died in office.

Westerners' settlement (1830–1862, 1863–1874)

Chief Islanders 

 1830–1848: Matteo (Matthew) Mazarro†
 1848–1862, 1863 – 10 April 1874: Nathaniel Savory† (acting to 1853; magistrate 1853–1859)

Japanese suzerainty (1862–1863, 1876–1945)

Governors 

 18 January 1862 – 7 April 1862: Mizuno Chikugo no Kami Tadanori
 August 1862 – May 1863: Sakunosuke (Sakusuke) Obana

Chief Commissioner 

 December 1876 – November 1880: Sakunosuke (Sakusuke) Obana

Commanders, Ogasawara Corps

U.S. occupation (1945–1968)

Military Governors, Bonin, Volcano and Marcus Islands (in Tokyo)

 1 January 1947 – 9 April 1951: the Commanders-in-Chief, Far East Command

Military Governors, Bonin Islands (in Pearl Harbor) 

 9 April 1951 – 26 July 1968: the Commanders-in-Chief, U.S. Pacific Fleet

Deputy Military Governors, Bonin – Volcano Islands (on the Marianas; Saipan, then Guam) 

(the Commanders Naval Forces Marianas [to 1956 Commanders Marianas Area])

 August 1945 – 1946: George D. Murray
 1946 – August 1949: Charles Alan Pownall
 August 1949 – 1950: Edward Coyle Ewen
 1950 – 1951: Osborne Bennett Hardison
 July 1951 – 1954: Ernest Wheeler Litch Jr.
 February 1954 – 27 October 1955: Marion Emerson Murphy
 13 February 1956 – 1957: William Bronley Ammon
 1957 – 1960: William L. Erdmann
 17 January 1960 – 1961: Waldemar F. A. Wendt
 September 1961 – January 1963: John Starr Coye Jr.
 January 1963 – 1964: Thomas Aloysius Christopher
 1964 – 1966: Horace Virgil Bird
 1966 – 25 June 1968: Carlton Benton Jones

Officers-in-Charge, Bonin Islands 

 6 October 1945 – 8 October 1946: Presley Morehead Rixey (Commander of Bonin Occupation Force)
 8 October 1946 – June 1947: Vernon Bertram Hagenbuckle
 June 1947 – April 1951: ....

Military Government Representatives, Bonin – Volcano Islands 

(Officers-in-Charge, U.S. Naval Facility Chichi Jima, Bonin Islands)

 April 1951 – June 1952: Frederick Alfred Pobst
 June 1952 – 21 July 1953: John Walter Kelsey Jr.
 21 July 1953 – October 1955: Clayton Ernest "Jack" Frost
 October 1955 – March 1958: Earl Dean Bronson
 May 1958 – June 1960: Thomas Gordon Rice
 July 1960 – June 1963: Vernon Ward Weatherby
 July 1963 – January 1964: John Robert Thorndyke
 February 1964 – July 1964: Ronald Lee Farrar
 July 1964 – December 1965: James Hamilton Reynolds
 December 1965 – 25 June 1968: Dale Wayne Johnson

See also 
 United States Military Government of the Ryukyu Islands
 United States Civil Administration of the Ryukyu Islands
 List of U.S. governors of the Ryukyu Islands

Notes

References 

Izu–Bonin–Mariana Arc
Japan history-related lists
United States history-related lists
Lists of governors